Agustin's Newspaper (Spanish: El diario de Agustín) is a 2008 Chilean documentary directed by Ignacio Agüero.

Plot
Journalism students start an investigation about the editorial line of El Mercurio S.A.P., a media corporation owned by Agustín Edwards Eastman that publishes Chilean daily newspapers El Mercurio, La Segunda, and Las Últimas Noticias.

The documentary focuses particularly on the role of El Mercurio, Chile’s leading conservative newspaper. The events covered include the land reform that occurred during the Eduardo Frei Montalva government, the opposition to Salvador Allende, the collaboration with Augusto Pinochet's military government, and the position held until the arrival of democracy in Chile. Overall, it presents a strong indictment of the newspaper and its editor, which are accused of public opinion manipulation, especially with disinformation campaigns.

Chapters
I. El Mercurio Lies
II. Foreign Help Is on the Way
III. The 119
IV. Crime of Passion
V. A Guide for Society
VI. Slanders and Libels
VII. Epilogue

Awards
The film won an Altazor Award in 2009 for best director in a documentary film.

References

External links
 
 
 Agustin's Newspaper in CineChile.cl

2008 films
Chilean documentary films
2000s Spanish-language films
2008 documentary films
Documentary films about mass media people
Documentary films about public opinion
Documentary films about journalism
Documentary films about Latin American military dictatorships
Films about the Chilean military dictatorship